Naomi Kai Thomas-Chinnama (born 13 May 2004) is an Australian soccer player who plays as a defender for Melbourne City FC in the A-League Women.

Club career
In 2021, she made her debut for Melbourne City FC in a 2–0 home loss against Sydney FC, coming on for Teigen Allen in the 72nd minute.

International career
In 2022, Thomas-Chinnama made her debut for the Young Matildas in a 5–1 win over New Zealand. Hunter was a part of Australia's side at the 2022 FIFA U-20 Women's World Cup playing in all three games against Costa Rica, Brazil and Spain.

Thomas-Chinnama was a part of Australia U23's team at the 2022 AFF Women's Championship, featuring in two games.

References

2004 births
Women's association football defenders
Australian women's soccer players
Living people
Melbourne City FC (A-League Women) players
A-League Women players
Sportswomen from Victoria (Australia)